Llanishen railway station is a railway station serving the areas of Llanishen and Lisvane in Cardiff, south Wales. It is a stop on the Rhymney Line of the Valley Lines network.

Services
This drops to half-hourly in the evenings and to two-hourly on Sundays (southbound trains run to  instead of Penarth)

See also
List of railway stations in Cardiff

Notes

External links

Llanishen, Cardiff
Railway stations in Cardiff
DfT Category F2 stations
Former Rhymney Railway stations
Railway stations in Great Britain opened in 1871
Railway stations served by Transport for Wales Rail